Rory McCarthy (born 4 September 1975) is a retired Irish sportsperson.  He played hurling with his local club St Martin's and with the Wexford senior inter-county team.  He played in the half-back line.

Early life

Rory McCarthy was born near Murrintown, County Wexford in 1975.  He was educated locally in Murrintown N.S. and from an early age he showed great skill at Gaelic games.  McCarthy later attended St. Peter’s College, a virtual academy for young hurling and football talent.  Here he won a Leinster Colleges’ medal in football at both senior and junior levels, an All-Ireland Colleges medal in football in 1993.  While his early successes were in the game of football it would be as a hurler that he would have much more success.
Rory now works in Gorey Community School as a maths and Physical Education teacher.

Playing career

Club

McCarthy plays his club hurling and football with his local St Martin's club.  He has experienced some success at underage levels and in 1999 he won his first, county championship medal. He later went on to win another in 2008

References

External links
GAA Info Profile
Hogan Stand Article

1975 births
Living people
People educated at St Peter's College, Wexford
St Martin's (Wexford) hurlers
Wexford inter-county hurlers